The 1952 Tour de Suisse was the 16th edition of the Tour de Suisse cycle race and was held from 14 June to 21 June 1952. The race started and finished in Zürich. The race was won by Pasquale Fornara.

General classification

References

1952
Tour de Suisse
1952 Challenge Desgrange-Colombo